Kristoffer Bryan Domeij (October 5, 1982October 22, 2011) was a United States Army soldier who is recognized as the U.S. soldier with the most deployments to be killed in action; at the time of his death he was on his fourteenth deployment. Over ten years he had served four deployments in Iraq and at least nine in Afghanistan; he trained as a Joint Terminal Attack Controller and was recognized as epitomizing the Ranger motto "Rangers lead the way". After a distinguished and highly decorated career, he was killed by a roadside improvised explosive device, along with two other Rangers, in Kandahar Province in Afghanistan.  The Joint Fires Observer classroom building at Fort Sill is named in his honor. A film was made in his memory.

Early life and education
Born in Santa Ana, California, he graduated from Rancho Bernardo High School in 2001 and enlisted in the U.S. Army in July 2001.

Career
After graduating from the Ranger Indoctrination Program (RIP), Domeij was assigned to C Company, 2nd Battalion, 75th Ranger Regiment in 2002 where he served as a Forward Observer. In 2003, he was one of the soldiers who helped rescue Private First Class Jessica Lynch in Iraq. He later served in 2nd Battalion's Headquarters and Headquarters Company as a Joint Terminal Attack Controller (one of the first Rangers to be so qualified), in B Company as the Fires Support Noncommissioned Officer, and again in HHC as the Battalion Fires Support Noncommissioned Officer; these were ordinarily positions "reserved for Air Force airmen who serve with ground combat units and call in airstrikes from fighters or bombers flying overhead". 

His military education included "Basic Airborne Course, the Ranger Assessment and Selection Program, the Warrior Leader’s Course, the Advanced Leader’s Course, the Senior Leader’s Course, U.S. Army Ranger Course, Jumpmaster School, Pathfinder School, Joint Firepower Control Course, and Joint Fires Observer Course". He served for ten years.

With 14 deployments, Domeij is the US soldier with the most deployments to be killed in action. The previous highest total was 12. For Rangers, tours are a "constant churn" of combat missions; a Ranger battalion typically conducts "400 - 500 missions during a combat deployment". During Domeij's many deployments, he was often involved in "ferocious, close-quarters fighting". A commenter to Mother Jones noted:"... as members of the SPECOPS community, Rangers handle their deployments differently from regular Army and Marine line units. By his estimation, Sgt. 1st Class Domeij likely spent closer to four or more years in the war zones, not including pre- and post-deployment training. And as our reader points out, it’s not just the time you do, but what you do in that time: The 75th Ranger Regiment typically deploys on 105-day deployments, i.e. a little longer than three months. What they lack in calendar length is made up in intensity: they typically conduct an operation every single night of their deployments with few exceptions. That someone has been deployed 14 times is mortifying and sad, especially in this case".

Several have commented that Domeij's willingness to selflessly serve his country may be transcended by the question "whether this country is abusing its fit young people’s sense of commitment".

Domeij was one of three soldiers killed by a roadside bomb near Kandahar Province on October 22, 2011. Lieutenant Ashley White, 24, a cultural support specialist, and Pvt. 1st Class Christopher Horns, 20, who was on his first tour, were killed in the same attack. Reflecting on the diversity of the three, a former Ranger commented, "A young line Ranger on his first deployment, a seasoned [leadership] Ranger on his 14th and a female Officer as part of the overall assault force. Things have certainly taken a turn for the surreal". 

Domeij, however, disliked being in the spotlight and wouldn't have wanted "any media coverage" if anything ever happened to him. His former football coach, Jeff Carpenter, remarked that Domeij would have felt bothered by the attention, as "he felt he was a guy doing his job".

Legacy
In 2019, Devin Graham filmed HERE AM I, SEND ME, a documentary of his visit to Normandy alongside two teams: one made up of Domeij's 75th Ranger comrades with his mother Scoti Domeij, the second consisting of retired Special Operations Forces soldiers with their families. The film recorded their parachute jumps, alongside other attendees, from WWII C-47 Skytrains to commemorate the 75th anniversary of D-Day. Domeij's team, including Scoti, made their jump especially to honor Kristoffer's life and sacrifice. The forty minute film debuted on YouTube on Veterans Day 2019 and went on to be screened at film festivals worldwide.

Domeij has also been honored in several memorials:

The Joint Fires Observer classroom building at Fort Sill is named in honor of Sgt. 1st Class Domeij.

On February 8, 2011, the names of fallen Rangers SFC Kristoffer Domeij, Pfc. Christopher Horns, Sgt. Tyler Holtz, and Spc. Ricardo Cerros Jr. were inscribed on the memorial obelisk at 2nd Battalion's headquarters in Joint Base Lewis-McChord, Washington.

The epitaph on his headstone quotes The Book of Isaiah 6:8:Then I hear the voice of the Lord come out saying, "Whom shall I send, and who will go for us?" Then I said, "Here I am, send me!"

A Belgian blonde beer by the Narrows Brewing Company was named after his radio call sign, "Tyrant-22".  S.W.O.R.D. International released a 7.62x51mm rifle named the "Mk-17 MOD 0 Tyrant 22" in his honor.

Personal
Domeij was survived by his spouse Sarah, his two daughters, his brother Kyle, and his mother Scoti.

Awards and decorations
SFC Domeij was awarded the following through out his military career:

References

Notes

Citations

External links

  Archived at GhostArchive
LeadTheWay Archived
Kristoffer Diomeij at Find a Grave (Archived).  Buried next to his father Robert Erling Domeij.

1982 births
2011 deaths
American military personnel killed in the War in Afghanistan (2001–2021)
United States Army personnel of the Iraq War
United States Army non-commissioned officers
United States Army personnel of the War in Afghanistan (2001–2021)